Sidbury is a village in the Albany district of the Eastern Cape province of South Africa.

History
The village was founded by Lieutenant  Richard Daniell, R.N.  He was leader of the Daniell party of the British 1820 Settlers to the Eastern Cape which came to South Africa on the ship the Duke of Marlborough .  He named the village after his home town of Sidbury, Devonshire.

He provided land and funds for the building of a church in the village, the church (named St Peter's after the church in Sidbury, Devonshire) was built in 1841 and was one of the first ten Anglican churches in South Africa. The church predates the establishment of the Diocese of Cape Town. The church is a heritage site recognised by the South African Heritage Resource Agency.

In the 1890s, the community of Sidbury started a cricket club which continues to the present despite its small population.

Notable people
Frances Charlotte Slater who went by the pen name Francis Bancroft wrote 17 novels including works such as The Veldt Dwellers (1912) and Thane Brandon (1913).

See also
 Diocese of Grahamstown
 Kwantu Private Game Reserve

Notes and references

Further reading

External links
St Peter's - Sidbury

1820 Settlers
1820 establishments in the Cape Colony